Alec Stuart "Al" Richardson (20 December 1941 – 22 November 2003) was a British Trotskyist historian and activist.

Biography 
Born in Woolley Colliery, a pit village near Barnsley in Yorkshire, Richardson studied theology at the University of Hull before becoming a lecturer at the University of Exeter. He joined the Communist Party of Great Britain, but left after reading Isaac Deutscher's biography of Leon Trotsky. Convinced of Trotskyism, Richardson joined the Socialist Labour League (SLL), and resigned from the faculty at Exeter to become a history teacher at Forest Hill School, South London. He soon quit the SLL to join the rival International Marxist Group (IMG), and became prominent in the Vietnam Solidarity Campaign.

Despite having hitchhiked to Paris to join the events of May 1968, Richardson was part of a small group that rejected the IMG's turn away from trade unions and the labour movement to work in the student movement. He became a founding member of the breakaway Revolutionary Communist League and was elected to its leadership, but in 1973 he left the League.

From the mid-1970s, Richardson focused his attention on recording the history of Trotskyism in Britain. He began interviewing veterans of the movement and, with Sam Bornstein, published three books on the topic through their Socialist Platform publishing house. In 1988, they founded the journal Revolutionary History, dedicated to the history of the anti-Stalinist left.

Richardson worked with various Trotskyist groups, in particular Workers Liberty, Workers Action and the Militant tendency, whose approaches he felt were closest to his own. However, in contrast to these groups, he opposed campaigns on the basis of race, gender or sexuality, believing that they were popular frontist. He never abandoned work inside the Labour Party, because he believed that any future revolutionary party can emerge only from within a mass working-class party.

Richardson continued teaching and writing until his death. Papers left by Richardson and Jim Higgins have been deposited in the Library of the University of London, which is in the University's Senate House.

References

External links
"Al Richardson / Jim Higgins papers" at Senate House Libraries, University of London.
John McIlroy, "Al Richardson", The Guardian, 24 January 2004.
Richard Price, "Obituary - Al Richardson 1941–2003: Historian of the Revolutionary Movement", Workers Action, Number 24, January 2004.
Bruce Robinson, "Al Richardson: An 'Unorthodox Orthodox' Trotskyist", Workers Liberty, 8 December 2003.
Remembering an Activist and a Scholar", LabourNet, 8 December 2003.

1941 births
2003 deaths
Academics of the University of Exeter
Alumni of the University of Hull
British Marxist historians
British Marxists
British Trotskyists
Communist Party of Great Britain members
Historians of communism
International Marxist Group members
Workers Revolutionary Party (UK) members